is a fighting game developed by Konami Computer Entertainment Aomori and Hudson Soft and published by Konami for the PlayStation Portable (PSP). The game celebrates the 50th anniversaries of shōnen manga magazines Weekly Shōnen Sunday and Weekly Shōnen Magazine published by Shogakukan and Kodansha, respectively, featuring prominent manga characters from both publications as playable fighters.

Playable characters

References

External links
Official website 

2009 video games
Crossover fighting games
Hudson Soft games
Japan-exclusive video games
Konami games
PlayStation Portable games
PlayStation Portable-only games
Video games based on anime and manga
Multiplayer and single-player video games
Video games developed in Japan